Albignac is a commune in the Corrèze department in the Nouvelle-Aquitaine region of central France.

The inhabitants of the commune are known as Albussacois or Albussacoises

Geography

Albignac is located some 15 km east of Brive-la-Gaillarde and 20 km south by south-east of Saint-Germain-les-Vergnes. Access to the commune from the south is by the D175 road which branches from the D921 east of Lanteuil. The D175 goes to the village of Albignac then continues north to the hamlet of La Borie and joins the D130 inside the commune. The D130 enters the commune from Aubazine in the north by a circuitous route through La Viallard and exiting the commune in the south-east towards Fontourcy.  The D14 road also runs from north to south inside the western side of the commune. There is an extensive network of country roads in the commune. The commune is mixed farmland and forest.

A number of streams cross the commune feeding into the Roanne with the Donjou stream traversing the commune from east to west into the Roanne river which forms both the western and southern borders of the commune. The Roanne flows north into the Correze river at Confolens.

Hamlets
There are a substantial number of hamlets in the commune. These are:

Auzelou
Bayle
Boisgrand
la Borie
la Borie-Blanche
le Bournazel
Chantegril
la Crozade
l'Evescat
Flaugeat
le Juge
Miallet
Ombinat
Pierrefiche
Plainefage
le Prieur
Puy-de-Bayle
Quicolagne
Rhode
la Rivière
les Sautes
la Tronche
la Verde
le Viallard
la Voûte

Toponymy
Albignac comes from the Latin name of a man called Albinus or Albinius.

It was called Albiniaco in 1095.

History
The 11th century Albignac had a priory which belonged to the abbey of Saint-Michel-de-la-Cluse in Piedmont. In the 15th century the priory depended on the Coyroux Priory at Aubazine.

In the 12th century, Albignac depended on the Viscount of Gimel.

Heraldry

Administration

List of Successive Mayors of Albignac

Population

Sites and Monuments

The Church of Notre-Dame (12th century) is registered as an historical monument. It has a bell tower, nave, choir, capitals, and bas-reliefs in stone. It contains several items which are registered as historical objects:
An Altar, 2 banks of Altar seating, Tabernacle, and Console (19th century)
A Capital converted to a Stoup (12th century)
A Bronze Bell (1601)
Remains from Prehistory and Antiquity
Tower of the old priory with a monumental spiral staircase

Notable people linked to the commune
Jean-Baptiste Laumond, (born at Albignac on 22 August 1865 and died 18 November 1957 in Aubazine), Mayor of Aubazine, councilor general, MP, Provost of Andorra

See also
Communes of the Corrèze department

References

External links
Communauté de communes Midi Corrézien 
Albignac on Géoportail, National Geographic Institute (IGN) website 
Albignac on the 1750 Cassini Map

Communes of Corrèze